Carless may refer to:

 Betty Careless (c. 1704–1739), probably born Elizabeth Carless, notorious courtesan and bagnio owner in London
 Ernie Carless (1912–1987), Welsh cricketer
 Hugh Carless (1925–2011), British explorer and diplomat
 John Henry Carless (1896–1917), English Royal Navy sailor, posthumous First World War recipient of the Victoria Cross 
 Roy Carless (1920–2009), Canadian cartoonist
 Simon Carless, video game industry journalist and editor

See also
 Carless, having no automobile, without a car also known as Fernando Lezcano.
 Petrochem Carless Ltd, originally Carless, a UK oil company
 Careless (surname)
 List of car-free places
 Kahless, a fictional character in the Star Trek universe